Kui is a Timor–Alor–Pantar language spoken in several enclaves on Alor Island, East Nusa Tenggara, Indonesia. The language is called 'Masin lak' in Kui. Although the exact number of speakers is unknown, Kui is an endangered language since speakers are shifting to Alor Malay.

Kui is mainly spoken in the towns of Moru, Bouraga and Lerabarang. Kirramung and Kui have some sort of dialect relationship, being considered by some as being the same language and some others as being two different languages. This is typical of Timor-Alor-Pantar (TAP) languages. It has verb-final word order which means that the verb comes last in a sentence, unlike in English where the verb usually comes in the middle.

Phonology

Consonants

Consonant phonemes are shown in the chart below. Marginal phonemes are enclosed in parenthesis.

Vowels

Monophthongs

References

Alor–Pantar languages
Languages of Indonesia